Rignot Glacier is a glacier about  long draining north from the King Peninsula into Abbot Ice Shelf. Named by Advisory Committee on Antarctic Names (US-ACAN) after Eric Rignot, Jet Propulsion Laboratory, California Institute of Technology, geophysicist; uses field and remotely sensed data to study Antarctic glacier mechanics from the 1990s to the present.

See also
 List of glaciers in the Antarctic
 Glaciology

References
 

Glaciers of Thurston Island